Calvin R. "Cal" Larson (born August 10, 1930) is an American politician who served as a member of the Minnesota House of Representatives from 1967 to 1974 and Minnesota Senate from 1987 to 2006.

Early life and education 
Born in Glyndon, Minnesota, Larson graduated from Badger High School in 1948 and earned a Bachelor of Arts degree from Concordia College. Larson then served in the United States Navy during the Korean War.

Career 
Larson was first elected to the Minnesota House of Representatives in 1967, with a Nonpartisan Election–Conservative Caucus party affiliation. He served district 55 for three terms, ending in 1972. He continued in the House from 1973 to 1974 representing district 11A.

Following an absence from the state legislature from 1975 to 1986, Larson was elected as State Senator for district 10 in 1986, as an Independent Republican. He continued to fill this seat in the Senate until 2006, but by the 1996 election had changed his party affiliation to Republican.

Personal life 
Larson resides in Fergus Falls, Minnesota with his wife, Loretta. They have two children. Larson is a Lutheran.

Electoral history 
2006 Minnesota State Senate District 10
Cal Larson (R), 14191 votes, 44.71%
Dan Skogen (DFL), 17530 votes, 55.23%
Write-In, 18 votes, 0.06%

2002 Minnesota State Senate District 10
Cal Larson (R), 19357 votes, 59.57%
Karl L. Hanson (DFL), 13111 votes, 40.35%
Write-In, 24 votes, 0.07%

References 

|-

|-

1930 births
Living people
People from Glyndon, Minnesota
Military personnel from Minnesota
American Lutherans
Members of the Minnesota House of Representatives
Minnesota Independents
Minnesota Republicans
Minnesota state senators
People from Fergus Falls, Minnesota
Concordia College (Moorhead, Minnesota) alumni
21st-century American politicians